John Broderick (1865 – August 9, 1939) was an American businessman and politician.

Broderick was born in Ireland, He lived in Chicago, Illinois was involved with the insurance business. Broderick served in the  Illinois Illinois Senate, 1899–1903, 1907–1923, 1927-1939 and was a Democrat.

References

External links

1865 births
1939 deaths
Businesspeople from Chicago
Politicians from Chicago
Democratic Party Illinois state senators
Irish emigrants to the United States (before 1923)